Aureoboletus gentilis is a species of bolete fungus in the family Boletaceae. Originally described as Boletus sanguineus var. gentilis by French mycologist Lucien Quélet in 1884, it was transferred to the genus Aureoboletus by Zdeněk Pouzar in 1957. It is considered vulnerable in the Czech Republic.

References

External links

gentilis
Fungi described in 1884
Fungi of Europe